is a Japanese professional racing cyclist, who last rode for UCI Women's Team . She rode in the women's road race at the 2016 UCI Road World Championships, finishing in 21st place.

Major results

2014
 9th Overall Tour of Thailand
2015
 5th Overall The Princess Maha Chackri Sirindhon's Cup
2016
 6th Overall Tour of Thailand
2017
 3rd  Road race, Asian Road Championships
2018
 3rd  Team pursuit, Asian Games
 4th Road race, Asian Road Championships
2019
 2nd  Team pursuit, Asian Track Championships

References

External links
 

1993 births
Living people
Japanese female cyclists
Place of birth missing (living people)
Cyclists at the 2018 Asian Games
Medalists at the 2018 Asian Games
Asian Games bronze medalists for Japan
Asian Games medalists in cycling
20th-century Japanese women
21st-century Japanese women